Moments is the first greatest hits album by Australian singer songwriter Mark Holden. The album was released in 1979. It includes tracks from his first three studio albums, Dawn in Darkness, Let Me Love You and Encounter.

The album was released on CD in  1995.

Track listing

References

External links 
 Moments by Mark Holden

Mark Holden albums
1979 compilation albums
Compilation albums by Australian artists
EMI Records compilation albums